Sifiso Ngobeni (born 8 February 1997) is a South African professional soccer player who plays as a left back for Mamelodi Sundowns and the South African national team.

Early life
Ngobeni was born in and grew up in Mamelodi and grew up supporting Mamelodi Sundowns.

Club career
Ngobeni started his career at Bloemfontein Celtic in 2019, making his debut in a 0–0 draw with Chippa United on 21 September. He made 20 appearances during the 2019–20 season and 21 during the 2020–21 season.. In July 2021, Ngobeni signed for reigning Premier Division champions Mamelodi Sundowns on a five-year contract.

International career
Ngobeni represented South Africa at the 2021 COSAFA Cup, making 5 appearances as South Africa won the tournament.

References

1997 births
Living people
People from Mamelodi
Sportspeople from Gauteng
South African soccer players
Association football fullbacks
Bloemfontein Celtic F.C. players
Mamelodi Sundowns F.C. players
South African Premier Division players
South Africa international soccer players